Mohd Shukri bin Yahaya (born 13 June 1988) is a Malaysian actor and director. Starting his acting career in 2011 after his talent was discovered by renowned film director Osman Ali through the film Jiwa Taiko. Since then, he has appeared in leading roles in many successful and high-rated television series including Asam Pedas Untuk Dia (2015), 7 Hari Mencintaiku (2016), Andainya Takdir (2017), Andainya Takdir 2 (2018), Kerana Dia Manusia Biasa (2019), 7 Hari Mencintaiku 2 (2020) and Rindu Awak Separuh Nyawa (2021). Throughout his career, he has won several awards and nominations for his roles in the television series 7 Hari Mencintaiku, Andainya Takdir and Split TV Series.

Early life
Shukri was born on 13 June 1988 in the Kuala Lumpur Hospital and is the fifth child of six siblings. He was educated with Sijil Pelajaran Malaysia (SPM).

Prior to joining showbiz, he began his career as an auditor at the 7-Eleven, Watsons and Maxis, where he subsequently conducted auditing in branch premises.

He later worked as a clerk at Bank Muamalat's Human Resources division in Jalan Melaka, Kuala Lumpur. During his tenure at Bank Muamalat, he handled internal program of the institution and assist teamwork.

Acting career
Shukri began his acting career in film, Jiwa Taiko and TV3 television series, Juvana. Since then, he remain active in television and film.

Personal life
Shukri married former actress Siti Nurfatihah "Tya" Adnan on 20 November 2015 and together they have a daughter Aaira Ameena, born in August 2016 and a son Maleeq Miqayl, born in July 2020.

Filmography

Film

Television series

Telemovie

Music video

Discography

Soundtrack appearance

Brand Ambassador
 Toyota Vios (2019 - present) 
 Bulan Bintang (2021 - present) 
 VANZO 
 Nivea 
 Nescafé

Awards and nominations

References

External links 
 
 
 
 

1988 births
Living people
Malaysian Muslims
Malaysian people of Malay descent
People from Kuala Lumpur
21st-century Malaysian male actors
Malaysian male actors
Malaysian male film actors
Malaysian male television actors